Oudtshoorn Municipality is a municipality located in the Western Cape Province of South Africa.  , the population was 95,933.

Geography
It abuts on the Prince Albert Municipality to the north, the George Municipality to the east, the Mossel Bay Municipality to the south, the Hessequa Municipality to the southwest and the Kannaland Municipality to the west.

According to the 2011 census the municipality has a population of 95,933 people in 21,910 households. Of this population, 77.3% describe themselves as "Coloured", 12.5% as "White", and 9.1% as "Black African". The first language of 91.0% of the population is Afrikaans, while 4.8% speak Xhosa and 2.3% speak English.

Most of the residents of the municipality live in the town of Oudtshoorn, which as of 2011 has a population of 61,507. East of Oudtshoorn are the towns of Dysselsdorp (pop. 12,544) and De Rust (pop. 3,566). There are small agricultural villages at Armoed (pop. 472) and De Hoop (pop. 151).

History
At the end of the apartheid era, the area that is today the Oudtshoorn Municipality formed part of the Klein Karoo Regional Services Council (RSC). The towns of Oudtshoorn and De Rust were governed by municipal councils elected by their white residents. The coloured residents of Bridgton (Oudtshoorn) and Blomnek (De Rust) were governed by management committees subordinate to the white councils. Dysselsdorp was also governed by a management committee. Bongolethu was governed by a town council established under the Black Local Authorities Act, 1982.

After the national elections of 1994 a process of local government transformation began, in which negotiations were held between the existing local authorities, political parties, and local community organisations. As a result of these negotiations, the existing local authorities were dissolved and transitional local councils (TLCs) were created for each town and village. In December 1994 the De Rust/Blomnek TLC replaced the Municipality of De Rust and Blomnek Management Committee. In January 1995 the Oudtshoorn TLC replaced the Municipality of Oudtshoorn, Bridgton Management Committee and Bongolethu Town Council. In the same month the Dysselsdorp TLC replaced the Dysselsdorp Management Committee.

The transitional councils were initially made up of members nominated by the various parties to the negotiations, until May 1996 when elections were held. At the time of these elections the Klein Karoo District Council was established in place of the Klein Karoo RSC, and transitional representative councils (TRCs) were elected to represent rural areas outside the TLCs on the District Council. The area that was to become Oudtshoorn Municipality included the Oudtshoorn TRC and a small part of the Bo-Langkloof TRC.

At the local elections of December 2000 the TLCs and TRCs were dissolved and the Oudtshorn Municipality was established as a single local authority. At the same election the Klein Karoo District Council was dissolved and replaced by the Eden District Municipality.

Politics 

The municipal council consists of twenty-five members elected by mixed-member proportional representation. Thirteen councillors are elected by first-past-the-post voting in thirteen wards, while the remaining twelve are chosen from party lists so that the total number of party representatives is proportional to the number of votes received. In the election of 1 November 2021 no party obtained a majority of seats on the council. The African National Congress (ANC) formed a minority coalition with the Independent Civic Organisation of South Africa (ICOSA) and the Oudtshoorn Gemeenskap Inisiatief (OGI). At the inaugural council meeting on 17 November, 24-year-old councillor Chad Louw of the ANC was elected mayor with ICOSA's Vlancio Donson as deputy mayor and the OGI's Colin Sylvester as speaker.

The following table shows the results of the 2021 election.

Coats of arms
Municipality (1) — The town council adopted the Van Reede van Oudtshoorn arms "with certain modifications" on 7 February 1908.  The arms were : Argent, two bars dancetty Sable (i.e. a silver shield with two black zig-zag stripes across it), with two golden gryphons as supporters.  A golden mural crown was placed above the shield (this appears to have been the "modification").

Municipality (2) — The arms were re-designed in 1959 by Ivan Mitford-Barberton and H. Ellis Tomlinson, and granted by the College of Arms on 9 September 1960. They were registered with the Cape Provincial Administration in June 1961 and at the Bureau of Heraldry in October 1970.

The changes to the design were the addition of a red chief bearing a golden mural crown to the shield;  the addition of a crest consisting of a pair of black wings inside a golden ring; and each supporter was given an ostrich feather to hold. For some reason, the municipal council later changed the colours: the chief was changed to gold and the mural crown to red, the wings were changed to silver and the ring to red, and the gryphons were changed from gold to red. The registration at the Bureau does not appear to have been amended to reflect these alterations.

Corruption
On 15 December 2021, employees of the municipality allegedly paid R3 million to an entity masquerading as a legitimate contractor.

References

External links
 Official website

Local municipalities of the Garden Route District Municipality